Barbara Anderson may refer to:

 Barbara Anderson (writer) (1926–2013), New Zealand fiction writer
 Barbara Anderson (actress) (born 1945), American actress
 Barbara Anderson (The Young and the Restless)
 Barbara Anderson (athlete), British Paralympic athlete
 Barbara McDermott (1912–2008), née Anderson, Lusitania survivor
 Barbara Anderson (scientist), New Zealand ecologist
 Barbara Anderson (anti-tax activist) (1943–2016)

See also
Barbara Andersen (disambiguation)